Rémy Labeau Lascary (born 3 March 2003) is a Guadeloupean professional footballer who plays as a forward for Lens.

Career
Labeau Lascary began his career with the Guadeloupean club Stade Lamentinois, before moving to the youth academy of Lens in 2018. He began his senior career with the Lens reserves in 2021, and started regularly training with the first team in December 2022. He made his professional debut with Lens as a late substitute in a 0–0 Ligue 1 tie with OGC Nice on 29 December 2022.

On 9 January 2023, he signed his first professional contract  with RC Lens until 2026.

References

External links
 

2003 births
Living people
Sportspeople from Ariège (department)
Guadeloupean footballers
RC Lens players
Ligue 1 players
Championnat National 2 players
Championnat National 3 players
Association football forwards